Teteman is a village in the Jasikan District of the Oti Region of Ghana. Teteman is located on the eastern border of Ghana on a mountain range that separates Ghana from the Republic of Togo.

Climate and geography
Teteman is an ancient settlement at an altitude of 1105 feet. The mountain range has a forest reserve which gives Teteman a serene and tranquil feel. Although Teteman is somewhat isolated from the outside world, the village has many of the amenities of a modern-day settlement.

Demographics

Infrastructure
The village has street lighting and a pressurized water pump. This prevents inhabitants from having to go down into the valley for water and carry it back up almost 1,000 feet.

References

Populated places in the Oti Region